Kid is a 1990 vigilante film (Action, Thriller). Also Known As: "Back for Revenge".

Cast
 C. Thomas Howell — Kid 
 Sarah Trigger — Kate 
 Brian Austin Green — Metal Louie  
 R. Lee Ermey — Luke 
 Dale Dye — Garvey 
 Michael Bowen — Harlan 
 Damon Martin — Pete 
 Lenore Kasdorf — Alice 
 Michael Cavanaugh — Walters 
 Tony Epper — Truck 
 Don Collier — Clarke 
 Don Baker — Jamie 
 Don Starr — Bleeker 
 Fred Sugerman — Dad 
 Heather McNair — Mom

Filming Locations
One of the locations was at Old Tucson - 201 S. Kinney Road, Tucson, Arizona, USA.

External links
 
 

1990 action films